R Normae is a Mira variable star located near Eta Normae in the southern constellation of Norma.
This is an intermediate-mass red giant star that is generating part of its energy through hydrogen fusion. Because this fusion is thought to be occurring under conditions of convection, it is generating an excess of lithium. The star ranges from magnitude 6.5 to 12.8 and has a relatively long period of 496 days. Located around 2,900 light-years distant, it shines with a luminosity 7764 times that of the Sun and has a surface temperature of 3161 K.

References

Mira variables
Norma (constellation)
Normae, R
138743
076377
CD-49 9787